Dylan Kuo (born 8 June 1977) is a Taiwanese actor, singer and model. He rose to fame in 2004 after playing the lead role in the television series The Outsiders. He is also known as Irons Kwok, his earlier western name, and Kwok Bun-chiu, his name pronounced in Cantonese.

Early life
Dylan Kuo was born in Taipei, Taiwan on 8 June 1977, the youngest of a two-child family. He has a brother older than him by 4 years. He has been described by family members and teachers as a shy, quiet and reserved child. His parents divorced when he was very young. He grew up in a single-parent home living with his mother and older brother. His mother worked 2 jobs in order to raise him and his brother, working as a kindergarten teacher by day and at night as a YMCA instructor teaching hairdressing courses. His mother died from breast cancer when he was 14 years old, which Kuo has said was the most unforgettable yet saddest moment in his life.

He then went to live with his father while his older brother moved out on his own. He graduated from Taipei College of Maritime Technology. Originally wanting to be an architect like his older brother, he decided it wasn't the career path he wanted after spending one year in the field.

Career

Acting 
In 2003, he made his acting debut in small roles, his most notable one for the idol series The Rose, playing one of Cecilia Yip's character Han Li's younger boyfriends. He had originally auditioned for the role "Han Jin" which Jerry Huang was eventually cast in. The director was impressed with his audition and decided to bring him back for a cameo role. After being offered more acting roles, Kuo was then signed under Duo Man Ni Productions to manage all his acting activities while Catwalk Production House still managed his advertisement and modeling activities.

In 2004, he got his big break playing the lead role in the television series The Outsiders, a drama about triad gangs in Taipei. After the success of The Outsiders and its sequel The Outsiders II, Kuo was invited by Hong Kong Director Joe Ma to play the lead in the 2005 Hong Kong film Embrace Your Shadow opposite Hong Kong singer-actress Fiona Sit.

For his film debut in Embrace Your Shadow, he plays a small-time cat burglar from Taiwan living in Hong Kong who has to deal with love and triads issues. His character "Juchin" was to originally only speak Mandarin, since director Joe Ma was aware that Kuo did not speak any Cantonese, but wanting to look believable as a person living in Hong Kong, Kuo decided to speak his lines as much as possible in Cantonese. In the behind-the-scenes footage of the film, Kuo can be seen asking the director and production crew on how to pronounce his lines in Cantonese. The film was well-received and he was invited to film another Hong Kong movie, the horror film Black Night.

In 2008, he signed with Hong Kong entertainment management company Emperor Entertainment Group to handle all his activities for the Hong Kong market due to his growing popularity in Hong Kong. After previously playing romantic, tough, cool and reserved characters, Kuo made his first foray into comedy, playing the dorky, nerdy and immature character "Ning Huan Yu" in CTS's 2008 romantic comedy Prince + Princess 2.

In 2009, Kuo made his debut in the Mainland China drama market and since then has mainly concentrated his career there. In 2010, he signed to Taiwanese music and entertainment company HIM International Music, where the company will manage his music, advertisements, modelling and acting activities.

Music 
In 2007, he started his music career signing under record label Warner Music Taiwan. His first album released was Not Anymore. Kuo also occasionally performs the theme songs of the dramas he has acted in.

Personal life
Kuo was previously in a long-term public relationship with a woman simply known as Amy to the public. He and Amy started dating during his early modeling career. It was a long-distance relationship because Amy left Taiwan during the second year of their relationship to study in the United States. Kuo confirmed in 2008 that he and Amy had ended their relationship some time in 2007.

Kuo has a mild case of obsessive–compulsive disorder. He revealed in an interview that he carries a tooth brush, tooth paste and dental floss with him everywhere, and he must brush his teeth after every meal. Also showering three times a day to make sure he doesn't have any body odor and putting on cologne whenever he heads outside his home, even if it is a few minute errand to the local market or bank.

Kuo is best friends with actor Peter Ho. The two met while collaborating on the 2007 drama Men and Legends. The two share an interest in body building and a passion for video gaming. Kuo served as best man at Ho's 2016 wedding.

Filmography

Television series

Film

Music video appearances

Discography

Studio albums

Soundtrack singles

References

External links
 
 
 

1977 births
Living people
Taiwanese male television actors
Taiwanese male film actors
Male actors from Taipei
Taiwanese idols
21st-century Taiwanese male singers
21st-century Taiwanese male actors